Flarf poetry was an avant-garde poetry movement of the early 21st century. The term Flarf was coined by the poet Gary Sullivan, who also wrote and published the earliest Flarf poems. Its first practitioners, working in loose collaboration on an email mailing list, used an approach that rejected conventional standards of quality and explored subject matter and tonality not typically considered appropriate for poetry. One of their central methods, invented by Drew Gardner, was to mine the Internet with odd search terms then distill the results into often hilarious and sometimes disturbing poems, plays and other texts.

Pioneers of the movement include Jordan Davis, Katie Degentesh, Drew Gardner, Nada Gordon, Mitch Highfill, Rodney Koeneke, Michael Magee, Sharon Mesmer, Mel Nichols, Katie F-S, K. Silem Mohammad, Rod Smith, Gary Sullivan and others.

Overview

Joyelle McSweeney wrote in the Constant Critic:

Joshua Clover wrote in The Claudius App:

In 2007, Barrett Watten, a poet and cultural critic, long associated with the so-called Language poets observed that:

Discussion about Flarf has been broadcast by the BBC and NPR and published in magazines such as The Atlantic, Bookforum, The Constant Critic, Jacket, The Nation, Rain Taxi, The Wall Street Journal and The Village Voice. Further discussion has taken place on dozens of blogs and listservs across the United States, and in Australia, Denmark, Finland, Germany, Holland, Mexico, and elsewhere.

See also
Cut-up technique
Found poetry
Googlism
Informationist poetry
Spam poetry
Word salad (computer science)

References

External links

Poems on-line
FLARF: MAINSTREAM Poetry for a MAINSTREAM World a weblog, active since January 2003, devoted to the poetics of flarf
Flarf Feature at Jacket Magazine includes work from some of this movement's more recognizable practitioners including:  Jordan Davis, Katie Degentesh, Benjamin Friedlander, Drew Gardner, Nada Gordon, Rodney Koeneke, Michael Magee, Sharon Mesmer, K. Silem Mohammad, Rod Smith, & Gary Sullivan
Poetry Magazine feature Flarf is Dionysus. Conceptual Writing is Apollo. An introduction to the 21st Century's most controversial poetry movements.
An Italian example of "Googlism": https://ita.calameo.com/read/000115790b3167bea3911

Audio and textual practice: essays and discussion
The Flarf Files at the Electronic Poetry Center
Flarf: From Glory Days to Glory Hole an article by Gary Sullivan at The Brooklyn Rail
Google-Inspired Verse Gains Respect an article by Gautam Naik in the Wall Street Journal
The Tragic and the Wacky a review of Gary Sullivan's PPL in a Depot in Jacket Magazine
The Virtual Dependency of the Post-Avant and the Problematics of Flarf an article by Dan Hoy at Jacket Magazine
O, You Cosh-Boned Posers! this essay from the Village Voice is subtitled: "Awful poems sought and found: From spam to Google, flarf redefines random"
"The New Pandemonium" essay on flarf by Rick Snyder
"Googling Flarf" by Michael Gottlieb
Ron Silliman on Michael Magee's My Angie Dickinson
Studio 360: Schreiber, Flarf, Redman discussions, interviews, and readings of flarf poetry
"Can Flarf Ever Be Taken Seriously?" article in Poets and Writers
Petroleum Hat The Constant Critic's Joyelle McSweeney reviews Drew Gardner's "Petroleum Hat"
Flarf: Poetry Meme-Surfs With Kanye West and the LOLCats Article on Flarf in The Atlantic
Flarf Poetry Flarf primer on Bookforum featuring reviews of "The Anger Scale" by Katie Degentesh, "Petroleum Hat" by Drew Gardner, "Folly" by Nada Gordon, "Musee Mechanique" by Rodney Koeneke, "My Angie Dickinson" by Michael Magee, "Annoying Diabetic Bitch" by Sharon Mesmer. "Deer Head Nation" by K. Silem Mohammad, & "PPL in a Depot" by Gary Sullivan
"On Flarf" by Rachel Hyman
"You Call That a Poem?! Understanding the Flarf Movement by Jack Chelgren
"Generals and Globetrotters" by Joshua Clover

Music and performance
Flarf Orchestra CD Music and poetry conducted by Drew Gardner.
Flarf Orchestra live video The Flarf Orchestra performing live at Le Poisson Rouge in New York City. Features Katie Degentesh, Nada Gordon and Sharon Mesmer.

Flarf vs. Conceptualism controversy
Why Conceptualism is Better than Flarf: Vanessa Place Poet and lawyer Vanessa Place's talk recorded on March 11, 2010 at AWP 2010: Denver, "Flarf & Conceptual Poetry Panel"
 Why Flarf is better than Conceptualism by Drew Gardner K. Silem Mohammad has called this piece "Drew Gardner's answer to Vanessa Place"
conceptual or literal? American poet-critic Alan Gilbert weighs in on the controversy

Schools of poetry
Poetry movements
American poetry
Random text generation
21st-century poetry
American literary movements
21st-century American literature